The Fordham Environmental Law Review is a triannual law journal published by students at Fordham University School of Law, addressing topics in environmental law, legislation, and public policy. It was established in 1989 as the Fordham Environmental Law Report and changed in 1993 to the Fordham Environmental Law Journal. In 2004, the journal obtained its current name. The journal sponsors an annual symposium. It is the only law journal at Fordham University School of Law that allows first year law students to apply during their fall semester to become staff members.

External links

American law journals
Environmental law journals
Environmental Law
Publications established in 1989
Law journals edited by students
1989 establishments in New York City
Triannual journals
English-language journals
Fordham University School of Law